The Chamber of Peers or House of Peers refers to the legislative upper house in several countries with a peerage :

 Chamber of Peers (France) from 1814 to 1848
 House of Peers (Japan) from 1889 to 1947
 Chamber of Most Worthy Peers (Portugal) from 1826–1838 and again from 1842–1910
 Chamber of Peers (Spain), from 1834 to 1836
 United Kingdom :
 The British House of Lords is known as the "House of Peers" for ceremonial purposes
 The pre-1801 Irish House of Lords
 Cromwell's Other House or House of Peers (1658–1659) during the final years of the Protectorate
 Reform of the House of Lords

See also 
 House of Lords (disambiguation)
 Chamber of Princes
 Peer of the realm
 Peerage